The 1960 Cotton Bowl Classic was the 24th edition of the college football bowl game, played at the Cotton Bowl in Dallas, Texas, on Friday, January 1. Part of the 1959–60 bowl game season, it matched the independent and top-ranked Syracuse Orangemen and #4 Texas Longhorns of the Southwest Conference (SWC). The favored Orangemen won, 23–14.

Teams

Syracuse

The Orangemen had just completed a perfect season for the first time in their history and were declared national champions by both major polls. They were looking for their first win in the Cotton Bowl, having lost previously three years earlier.

Texas

The Longhorns opened with eight wins and were co-champions of the Southwest Conference; after a late-season home loss to rival TCU, they dropped from second to fourth in the rankings. This was the first Cotton Bowl appearance for third-year head coach Darrell Royal and the first for the Longhorns in seven years.

Game summary
The longest touchdown pass in Cotton Bowl history happened in this game as Syracuse halfback Gerhard Schwedes threw an 87-yard pass to Ernie Davis to give the Orangemen an early lead 1:13 into the game. Davis added in a touchdown run midway through the second quarter to extend the lead to 15–0 at halftime.

Jack Collins caught a 69-yard pass from Bobby Lackey to narrow the lead 1:46 into the third quarter, but the conversion failed, making it only 15–6. While Texas was trying to narrow the lead, Davis intercepted a Lackey pass at the Texas 24.  Three plays later Schwedes ran in for a 3-yard touchdown run to make it 23–6 after another conversion success. Lackey narrowed it to 23–14 on a touchdown run in the fourth quarter, but only 7:21 was left on the clock by then. From that point on, the two teams did not seriously threaten to score again as the game ended in a Syracuse win.

Scoring
First quarter
SYR – Ernie Davis 87-yard pass from Gerhard Schwedes (Bob Yates kick)
Second quarter
SYR – Davis 1-yard run (Davis pass from Dave Sarette)
Third quarter
TEX – Jack Collins 69-yard pass from Bobby Lackey (Rene Ramirez run failed)
SYR – Schwedes 3-yard run (Davis pass from Sarette)
Fourth quarter
TEX – Lackey 1-yard run (Richard Shulte pass from Lackey)

Statistics
{| class=wikitable style="text-align:center"
! Statistics !! Syracuse !!Texas
|-
| First Downs || 12 || 10
|-
| Yards Rushing|| 133 || 145
|-
| Yards Passing || 181 || 99
|-
| Total Yards || 314 || 244
|-
|Punts-Average ||6–33.3|| 5–42.4
|-
|Fumbles-Lost ||4–3|| 1–1
|-
|Interceptions|| 1|| 1
|-
|Penalties-Yards ||6–67|| 7–61.5
|}

References

External links
Cotton Bowl Classic – January 1, 1960

Cotton Bowl Classic
Cotton Bowl Classic
Syracuse Orange football bowl games
Texas Longhorns football bowl games
Cotton Bowl Classic
Cotton Bowl